The Jinkanpo Atsugi Incinerator was a waste incinerator located in Ayase, Kanagawa Prefecture, Japan, operated by Enviro-Tech (formerly Shinkampo). It began operation in the 1980s and was closed in 2001. The incinerator was near Naval Air Facility Atsugi, a base manned partly by several thousand United States Navy members and their families.

Throughout its history, the incinerator reportedly blew toxic and cancerous emissions over the neighbouring base facilities. The incinerator's owners, arrested and jailed for charges of tax evasion, neglected the maintenance of the facility. The pollution had become so much of a health concern for the American residents that if they showed signs of adverse health effects, the U.S. military authorities allowed them to leave early (usually service members are stationed at the base for a tour of three years). Many U.S. service members reported sickness and a few died from cancer shortly after moving back to the United States. However, the US Navy has not formally established a connection between their exposure and their disease. For a time, the base required service members to undergo medical screenings before being stationed at the base in order to ensure that they had no medical condition that would be worsened by the poor air quality.

In May 2001, the Japanese government purchased the plant for nearly 40 million dollars and shut it down following a United States Department of Justice lawsuit against the private incinerator owner. Dismantling was completed by the end of that year. Some former residents of Atsugi NAF still complain of health problems related to the incinerator's emissions and report that the USN has been reluctant to address their concerns.  The incinerator contaminated the base, especially the housing area, with dioxin, heavy metals, and other deadly toxins. In June, 2007, the USN's Environmental Health Center announced that it would conduct a study of the health population of those stationed at NAF Atsugi during the time the incinerator was in operation.

The Navy and Marine Corps Public Health Center has stated that a new health study is currently underway and should be released in the summer of 2009.

References

Notes

Web

History of the United States Navy
United States military in Japan
Buildings and structures in Kanagawa Prefecture
Japan–United States relations
Law of Japan
Pollution in Japan
Incinerators
Environmental disasters in Japan